Habib-Jean Baldé (born 8 February 1985 in Saint-Vallier, Saône-et-Loire) is a former professional footballer who played as a defender. He spent all of his career in France and Romania. Born in France, represented the Guinea national team at international level between 2007 and 2013, making 21 FIFA-official appearances and scoring 1 goal.

References

External links
 
 
 
 

1985 births
Living people
Sportspeople from Saône-et-Loire
Association football defenders
Citizens of Guinea through descent
Guinean footballers
French footballers
Guinea international footballers
2008 Africa Cup of Nations players
2012 Africa Cup of Nations players
Ligue 2 players
Championnat National players
Liga I players
FC Gueugnon players
Stade de Reims players
US Ivry players
CSM Ceahlăul Piatra Neamț players
FC Universitatea Cluj players
French sportspeople of Guinean descent
Guinean expatriate footballers
Footballers from Bourgogne-Franche-Comté
Guinean expatriate sportspeople in Romania
Expatriate footballers in Romania
Black French sportspeople
French expatriate footballers
French expatriate sportspeople in Romania